Asleh Marz (also Romanized as Āsleh Marz; also known as Ālmīrza, Aslamarz, Aşlāmarz, Aslammars, Aslemarz, and Eslamarz) is a village in Yeylan-e Shomali Rural District, in the Central District of Dehgolan County, Kurdistan Province, Iran. At the 2006 census, its population was 269, in 58 families. The village is populated by Kurds.

References 

Towns and villages in Dehgolan County
Kurdish settlements in Kurdistan Province